Foli Adade (born 12 May 1991) is a Ghanaian professional footballer who plays as a goalkeeper for Medeama and the Ghana national football team.

Club career
Adade played for Tema based football club, Tema Youth. In 2010, Adade joined Ebusua Dwarfs where Adade had been the first choice goalkeeper for the team, and in 2013, Adade joined Medeama in the Ghana Premier League.

International career
In June 2013, Adade was included in the Ghana twenty-six man team for two international friendly matches against Ivory Coast. In November 2013, coach Maxwell Konadu invited Adade to be included in the Ghana national team for the 2013 WAFU Nations Cup. Adade helped the Ghana national football team defeat Senegal, placing first by three goals to one. Adade was part of the Ghana national football team for the 2014 African Nations Championship that finished runner-up.

Honours

Club
Medeama SC
Ghanaian FA Cup Winner: 2013

National Team 

 WAFU Nations Cup Winner: 2013
 African Nations Championship Runner-up: 2014
 2014 FIFA World Cup qualification Brazil

References

Living people
Ghanaian footballers
Association football goalkeepers
1991 births
Medeama SC players
Ebusua Dwarfs players
Tema Youth players
Ghana Premier League players
2014 African Nations Championship players
Ghana A' international footballers